Tully Louise Bevilaqua (née Crook on 19 July 1972) is an Australian professional women's basketball player. She formerly played for the San Antonio Stars in the WNBA and the Perth Lynx in Australia's WNBL. The 5'7" Bevilaqua's play style is energetic and disruptive, so much so that she is usually in the top 10 in steals. In the 2005 regular season, she had more steals per turnover than any other player.

WNBA career
Bevilaqua was not drafted by a WNBA team, but was signed by the Cleveland Rockers as a free agent before the 1998 season began. She played only 12 regular-season games for them before being waived by the team in July 1998.

In 2000, she signed a free agent contract with the Portland Fire and played with them for three seasons until the franchise folded after the 2002 season.

In 2003, she signed another contract with the Seattle Storm, and played two seasons for them, capping the 2004 season when the Storm won the WNBA Championship, defeating the Connecticut Sun, two games to one.

In 2005, she signed with the Indiana Fever, and led them to a #2 seed in the playoffs, where they swept the New York Liberty in two games, but in turn were swept by the Connecticut Sun in the Eastern Conference Finals.

Despite Bevilaqua's WNBA success, she failed to make the Australian national team until 2006 at the age of 34, when she helped lead the Opals to the gold medal in the 2006 FIBA World Championship for Women.

On 27 August 2007, Bevilaqua played a key scoring, defensive, and leadership role in the greatest comeback in WNBA history when the Indiana Fever overcame a 22-point first half deficit to win the deciding game three of the Eastern Conference Semi-Finals against the Connecticut Sun. Later that week on 31 August 2007 Tully was awarded the Kim Perrot Sportsmanship Award from the WNBA.

The WNBA listed Bevilaqua's height at 5'7" (about 170 cm), though she was listed at only 164 cm (about 5'4.5") in the WNBL.

Bevilaqua is one of only four WNBA players to record at least 800 career assists and 500 career steals.

2004 Championship season
One of the highlights of Bevilaqua's career was her participation on the 2004 Seattle Storm championship team. In the championship series, the Connecticut Sun won the first game of a three-game series. Then, before sold-out crowds at Seattle's KeyArena, Bevilaqua and the Storm won the second and third games to take the crown as champion. Bevilaqua's role in the series was backup point guard to Sue Bird and Betty Lennox, but she contributed in every phase of the game—scoring, rebounding, and playing the tenacious defense that has become her trademark on the Indiana Fever.

Though listed as a backup guard, in the course of the Storm's 2004 championship run Bevilaqua played unusually long minutes. This was most evident in the second game against the Minnesota Lynx. Sue Bird was injured early in the game, and WNBA Finals MVP Betty Lennox quickly got into foul trouble. Storm coach Anne Donovan sent Bevilaqua in to run the offense, and she played 27 minutes to carry the team to victory. The Seattle crowd chanted her name repeatedly during the game.

Personal life
Bevilaqua was born in Merredin, Western Australia in 1972. She played Australian rules football as a youth. Her hobbies include karaoke singing, golfing, tennis, cricket, and reading Patricia Cornwell's novels. Bevilaqua wrote a regular column in The Canberra Times on the progress of the Canberra Capitals during the 2006/07 WNBL season, and helped launch Nfinity's women-specific basketball shoes in 2009.

In 2013, Bevilaqua married her partner Lindsay, with the union becoming official with Indiana's recognition of same-sex marriage in October 2014. Tully and Lindsay have two children, Parker and Mackenzie.

See also
 List of Australian WNBA players
 WNBL Defensive Player of the Year Award

References

External links
Official website
WNBA Player Profile
Fan site from her Seattle Storm playing days
Tully Bevilaqua's WNBA Blog
12 May 2005 INtake Weekly article
1 June 2005 WNBA article: "Tully Puts it 'Onya'"

1972 births
Living people
Australian expatriate basketball people in the United States
Australian women's basketball players
Basketball players at the 2006 Commonwealth Games
Basketball players at the 2008 Summer Olympics
Canberra Capitals players
Cleveland Rockers players
Commonwealth Games gold medallists for Australia
Indiana Fever players
LGBT basketball players
Australian LGBT sportspeople
Lesbian sportswomen
Medalists at the 2008 Summer Olympics
Olympic basketball players of Australia
Olympic medalists in basketball
Olympic silver medalists for Australia
People from Merredin, Western Australia
Perth Lynx players
Point guards
Portland Fire players
San Antonio Stars players
Seattle Storm players
Commonwealth Games medallists in basketball
Undrafted Women's National Basketball Association players
Medallists at the 2006 Commonwealth Games